Nicola Mancino (born 15 October 1931) is an Italian politician. He was President of the Senate of the Republic from 1996 to 2001. He was also president of Campania's regional parliament from 1965 to 1971, governor of Campania from 1971 to 1972 and Minister of the Interior from 1992 to 1994.

Early life
Mancino was born in Montefalcione, province of Avellino (Campania). He became first provincial and then regional secretary of Democrazia Cristiana (Italy's Christian Democratic Party), being elected for the first time in the Italian Senate in 1976. So far he had been reconfirmed in all subsequent elections.

Minister of the Interior
He was Minister of the Interior from 1992 to 1994. On 1 July 1992, magistrate Paolo Borsellino had a meeting with Mancino, who at the time had just been named as Minister; Borsellino would be killed just over two weeks later with a car bomb, on 19 July. Mancino however always denied that he had met Borsellino. In a television interview of 24 July 2009, judge Giuseppe Ayala said that:

However, later Ayala refuted these words in an interview to magazine Sette. A personal agenda in possess of Borsellino's family, has an annotation by the judge saying: "1 July h 19:30 : Mancino". Vittorio Aliquò, the other magistrate who was interviewing Mutolo at the time of ministry's phone call, later declared that he had accompanied Borsellino "up to the threshold of the minister's office". In 2007 a letter from Paolo Borsellino's brother, Salvatore, was published. Entitled 19 luglio 1992: Una strage di stato ("19 July 1992: A state massacre"), the letter supports the hypothesis that Minister of Interiors Nicola Mancino knew the causes of the magistrate's assassination. Borsellino's brother wrote:

A law enacted and signed by Mancino in 1993 during his tenure as Interior Minister permits the prosecution of those involved in racial, ethnic and religious discrimination and the incitement of hate crime. This law is commonly called the "Mancino law".

Later career
In 1994, after the dissolution of Democrazia Cristiana, Mancino adhered to the Italian People's Party (PPI), collaborating with its secretary, Mino Martinazzoli. In July of the same year, he opposed the alliance with the right-wing coalition led by Silvio Berlusconi, and also opposed the election of Rocco Buttiglione as PPI secretary.

Later, he became a member of La Margherita (The Daisy) coalition of parties born out of the left wing of the PPI. After the victory of the center-left coalition led by Romano Prodi in the 1996 elections, Mancino was elected President of the Italian Senate, and served from 9 May 1996 until 29 May 2001.

On 24 July 2006, he left the Senate and became deputy-president of the Consiglio Superiore della Magistratura, Italy's senior council of justice. In July 2012, prosecutors in Palermo ordered Mancino to stand trial for withholding evidence about the alleged talks between the Italian state and the Mafia during the latter's bombing campaign in 1992 that assassinated, among others, the judges Giovanni Falcone and Paolo Borsellino. On 20 April 2018, he was acquitted.

References

External links
Consiglio Superiore della Magistratura
Nicola Mancino at Italian Senate, XIII Legislature
Nicola Mancino at Italian Senate, XIV Legislature
Nicola Mancino at Radio Radicale

|-

|-

|-

1931 births
Living people
People from the Province of Avellino
Italian Ministers of the Interior
Presidents of the Italian Senate
Presidents of Campania
Christian Democracy (Italy) politicians
Honorary Knights Grand Cross of the Order of the British Empire
20th-century Italian politicians
Democracy is Freedom – The Daisy politicians
21st-century Italian politicians